The 2020 TCR Spa 500 will be the second edition of the TCR Spa 500 endurance touring car race. It is promoted by the WSC, the group behind the TCR concept, and Creventic, who promotes the 24H Series.

Teams and drivers

References

External links
 

Spa 500
Spa 500